John Crooke may refer to:
John Croke or Crooke (1553–1620), Speaker of the English House of Commons
John Crooke (musician) in Jolene (band) (founded in 1995)
John Smedley Crooke (1861–1951), British politician

See also
John Crook (disambiguation), several people
John Crookes (1890–1948), English cricketer